7-epi-α-Selinene synthase (EC 4.2.3.86) is an enzyme with systematic name (2E,6E)-farnesyl-diphosphate diphosphate-lyase (7-epi-α-selinene-forming). This enzyme catalyses the following chemical reaction

 (2E,6E)-farnesyl diphosphate  7-epi-α-selinene + diphosphate

The recombinant enzyme from Vitis vinifera forms (+)-valencene and (–)-7-epi-α-selinene.

References

External links 
 

EC 4.2.3